Ocuilan is a municipality in Mexico State in Mexico. The municipality covers an area of  344.84 km².

As of 2005, the municipality had a total population of 26,332.

References

Municipalities of the State of Mexico
Populated places in the State of Mexico